Normandie is an unincorporated community located within Sea Bright in Monmouth County, New Jersey, United States. The community is one of the four main built-up areas of Sea Bright and is a former stop on the New Jersey Southern Railroad. It is located along Route 36 between the CR 520 drawbridge to Rumson and Sandy Hook on a narrow strip of land between the Shrewsbury River and the Atlantic Ocean. The Sea Bright–Monmouth Beach Seawall passes through the neighborhood and Navesink Beach.

References

Sea Bright, New Jersey
Unincorporated communities in Monmouth County, New Jersey
Unincorporated communities in New Jersey